Kōdai, Kodai, Koudai or Kohdai (こうだい or コウダイ) is a masculine Japanese given name. Notable people with the name include:

Possible Writings
広大, "wide/broad/spacious, large/big"
弘大, "vast/broad/wide, large/big"
功大, "achievement/merits/success/honor/credit, large/big"
幸大, "happiness/blessing/fortune, large/big"
滉大, "deep and broad, large/big"
昴大, "The Pleiades, large/big"
晃大, "clear, large/big"
航大, "navigate/sail/cruise/fly, large/big"
廣大, "broad/wide/spacious, large/big"

People
, Japanese footballer
, Japanese footballer
, Japanese footballer
, Japanese footballer
, Japanese baseball player
, Japanese golfer
, Japanese footballer
, Japanese baseball player
, Japanese badminton player
, Japanese voice actor
, Japanese footballer
, Japanese baseball player
, Japanese footballer
, Japanese baseball player
, Japanese footballer
, Japanese racing driver
, Japanese baseball player
, Japanese footballer
, Japanese footballer

Japanese masculine given names